Loveline Obiji (born 11 September 1990) is a Nigerian powerlifter. She competed in the women's +61 kg event at the 2014 Commonwealth Games where she won a gold medal.

At the 2014 World Championships she was the 86kg category gold medal briefly as Randa Mahmoud's r world record setting last lift was not allowed. However Mahmoud appealed and her lift was allowed giving her the gold medal and the world record. Obiji took the silver.

References 

1990 births
Living people
Nigerian female weightlifters
Female powerlifters
Paralympic medalists in powerlifting
Paralympic powerlifters of Nigeria
Nigerian powerlifters
Powerlifters at the 2012 Summer Paralympics
Powerlifters at the 2020 Summer Paralympics
Medalists at the 2012 Summer Paralympics
Medalists at the 2020 Summer Paralympics
Paralympic gold medalists for Nigeria
Paralympic silver medalists for Nigeria
Commonwealth Games gold medallists for Nigeria
Commonwealth Games medallists in weightlifting
African Games gold medalists for Nigeria
African Games medalists in weightlifting
Weightlifters at the 2014 Commonwealth Games
Competitors at the 2015 African Games
20th-century Nigerian women
21st-century Nigerian women
Medallists at the 2014 Commonwealth Games